Still Creepin on Ah Come Up is a studio album credited solely to Bone Thugs-N-Harmony, released on March 18, 2008.

Track listing

Trivia
The track "Conspiracy" samples Bone Thugs-n-Harmony's "Foe tha Love of $", from their original 4× Platinum album, Creepin on ah Come Up.

References

2008 albums
Real Talk Entertainment albums
Bone Brothers albums
Albums produced by Big Hollis